Walter Gregory  "Joe" Herndon (born January 5, 1949) is an American R&B and soul singer, former bass singer of a version of doo-wop group The Spaniels and former bass singer for The Temptations (2003–15).

Biography

Herndon was born in Washington, D.C. and began his career joining the D.C.-based version of The Spaniels in the 1970s. He would remain singing with this version of the group until the late-1990s when he joined forces with former Temptations singer Glenn Leonard to form the splinter group The Temptations Experience.

Upon the dismissal of Temptations bass singer Harry McGilberry in late 2003, Herndon was asked to replace McGilberry as a featured member of the legendary Motown quintet by Otis Williams. Herndon left his job as Amtrak Conductor and made his official Temptations debut on their last Motown album, 2004's Legacy.

He remained a member of the group alongside Otis Williams, Bruce Williamson, Ron Tyson and Terry Weeks until his departure in 2015 and he was replaced by Willie Green.

References

1949 births
Living people
The Temptations members
Singers from Washington, D.C.
American soul singers
African-American male singers
American basses
American male dancers
American male singers
Dancers from Washington, D.C.